World War III or the Third World War, often abbreviated as WWIII or WW3, are names given to a hypothetical worldwide large-scale military conflict subsequent to World War I and World War II. The term has been in use since at least as early as 1941. Some apply it loosely to limited or more minor conflicts such as the Cold War or the war on terror. In contrast, others assume that such a conflict would surpass prior world wars in both scope and destructive impact.

Due to the development of nuclear weapons in the Manhattan Project, which were used in the atomic bombings of Hiroshima and Nagasaki near the end of World War II, and their subsequent acquisition and deployment by many countries afterward, the potential risk of a nuclear apocalypse causing widespread destruction of Earth's civilization and life is a common theme in speculations about a third world war. Another primary concern is that biological warfare could cause many casualties. It could happen intentionally or inadvertently, by an accidental release of a biological agent, the unexpected mutation of an agent, or its adaptation to other species after use. Large-scale apocalyptic events like these, caused by advanced technology used for destruction, could render most of Earth's surface uninhabitable.

Before the beginning of World War II in 1939, World War I (1914–1918) was believed to have been "the war to end [all] wars". It was popularly believed that never again could there possibly be a global conflict of such magnitude. During the interwar period, World War I was typically referred to simply as "The Great War". The outbreak of World War II disproved the hope that humanity might have "outgrown" the need for widespread global wars.

With the advent of the Cold War in 1945 and with the spread of nuclear weapons technology to the Soviet Union, the possibility of a third global conflict increased. During the Cold War years, the possibility of a third world war was anticipated and planned for by military and civil authorities in many countries. Scenarios ranged from conventional warfare to limited or total nuclear warfare. At the height of the Cold War, the doctrine of mutually assured destruction (MAD), which determined that an all-out nuclear confrontation would destroy all of the states involved in the conflict, developed. The potential for the absolute destruction of the human species may have contributed to both American and Soviet leaders avoiding such a scenario.

The various global military conflicts that have occurred since the start of the 21st century, most recently the 2022 Russian invasion of Ukraine, alongside rising tensions between the United States and China, have been perceived as potential flashpoints or triggers for a third world war.

Etymology

Time magazine

Time magazine was an early adopter, if not originator, of the term "World WarIII". The first usage appears in its 3 November 1941 issue (preceding the Japanese attack on Pearl Harbor on 7 December 1941) under its "National Affairs" section and entitled "World WarIII?" about Nazi refugee Dr. Hermann Rauschning, who had just arrived in the United States. In its 22 March 1943, issue under its "Foreign News" section, Time reused the same title "World WarIII?" about statements by then-U.S. Vice President Henry A. Wallace: "We shall decide sometime in 1943 or 1944... whether to plant the seeds of World War III." Time continued to entitle with or mention in stories the term "World WarIII" for the rest of the decade and onwards: 1944, 1945, 1946 ("bacterial warfare"), 1947, and 1948. Time persists in using this term, for example, in a 2015 book review entitled "This Is What World War III Will Look Like".

Military plans

Military strategists have used war games to prepare for various war scenarios and to determine the most appropriate strategies. War games were utilized for World War I and World War II.

Operation Unthinkable

British Prime Minister Winston Churchill was concerned that, with the enormous size of Soviet Red Army forces deployed in Central and Eastern Europe at the end of World War II and the unreliability of the Soviet leader Joseph Stalin, there was a serious threat to Western Europe. In April–May 1945, the British Armed Forces developed Operation Unthinkable, thought to be the first scenario of the Third World War. Its primary goal was "to impose upon Russia the will of the United States and the British Empire". The plan was rejected by the British Chiefs of Staff Committee as militarily unfeasible.

Operation Dropshot

"Operation Dropshot" was the 1950s United States contingency plan for a possible nuclear and conventional war with the Soviet Union in the Western European and Asian theaters. Although the scenario made use of nuclear weapons, they were not expected to play a decisive role.

At the time the US nuclear arsenal was limited in size, based mostly in the United States, and depended on bombers for delivery. "Dropshot" included mission profiles that would have used 300 nuclear bombs and 29,000 high-explosive bombs on 200 targets in 100 cities and towns to wipe out 85% of the Soviet Union's industrial potential in a single stroke. Between 75 and 100 of the 300 nuclear weapons were targeted to destroy Soviet combat aircraft on the ground.

The scenario was devised before the development of intercontinental ballistic missiles. It was also devised before U.S. President John F. Kennedy and his Secretary of Defense Robert McNamara changed the US Nuclear War plan from the 'city killing' countervalue strike plan to a "counterforce" plan (targeted more at military forces). Nuclear weapons at this time were not accurate enough to hit a naval base without destroying the city adjacent to it, so the aim of using them was to destroy the enemy's industrial capacity to cripple their war economy.

British-Irish cooperation 
The Republic of Ireland started planning for a possible nuclear war in the late 1940s. Co-operation between the United Kingdom and Ireland would be formed in the event of WWIII, where they would share weather data, control aids to navigation, and coordinate the Wartime Broadcasting Service that would occur after a nuclear attack. Operation Sandstone in Ireland was a top-secret British-Irish military operation. The armed forces from both states began a new coastal survey of Britain and Ireland cooperating from 1948 to 1955. This was a request from the United States to identify suitable landing grounds for the U.S. in the event of a successful Soviet invasion. By 1953, the co-operation agreed upon sharing information on wartime weather and the evacuation of civilian refugees from Britain to Ireland. Ireland's Operation Sandstone ended in 1966.

Exercises Grand Slam, Longstep, and Mainbrace

In January 1950, the North Atlantic Council approved NATO's military strategy of containment. NATO military planning took on a renewed urgency following the outbreak of the Korean War in the early 1950s, prompting NATO to establish a "force under a centralized command, adequate to deter aggression and to ensure the defense of Western Europe". Allied Command Europe was established under General of the Army Dwight D. Eisenhower, US Army, on 2 April 1951. The Western Union Defence Organization had previously carried out Exercise Verity, a 1949 multilateral exercise involving naval air strikes and submarine attacks.

Exercise Mainbrace brought together 200 ships and over 50,000 personnel to practice the defense of Denmark and Norway from the Soviet attack in 1952. It was the first major NATO exercise. The exercise was jointly commanded by Supreme Allied Commander Atlantic Admiral Lynde D. McCormick, USN, and Supreme Allied Commander Europe General Matthew B. Ridgeway, US Army, during the autumn of 1952.

The United States, the United Kingdom, Canada, France, Denmark, Norway, Portugal, Netherlands, and Belgium all participated.

Exercises Grand Slam and Longstep were naval exercises held in the Mediterranean Sea during 1952 to practice dislodging an enemy occupying force and amphibious assault. It involved over 170 warships and 700 aircraft under the overall command of Admiral Robert B. Carney. The overall exercise commander, Admiral Carney summarized the accomplishments of Exercise Grand Slam by stating: "We have demonstrated that the senior commanders of all four powers can successfully take charge of a mixed task force and handle it effectively as a working unit."

The Soviet Union called the exercises "war-like acts" by NATO, with particular reference to the participation of Norway and Denmark, and prepared for its military maneuvers in the Soviet Zone.

Exercise Strikeback

Exercise Strikeback was a major NATO naval exercise held in 1957, simulating a response to an all-out Soviet attack on NATO. The exercise involved over 200 warships, 650 aircraft, and 75,000 personnel from the United States Navy, the United Kingdom's Royal Navy, the Royal Canadian Navy, the French Navy, the Royal Netherlands Navy, and the Royal Norwegian Navy. As the largest peacetime naval operation up to that time, Exercise Strikeback was characterized by military analyst Hanson W. Baldwin of The New York Times as "constituting the strongest striking fleet assembled since World WarII".

Exercise Reforger

Exercise Reforger (from the REturn of FORces to GERmany) was an annual exercise conducted during the Cold War by NATO. While US troops could be easily flown across the Atlantic, the heavy equipment and armor reinforcements would have to come by sea and be delivered to POMCUS (Pre-positioned Overseas Material Configured to Unit Sets) sites. These exercises tested the United States and allied abilities to carry out transcontinental reinforcement. Timely reinforcement was a critical part of the NATO reinforcement exercises. The United States needed to be able to send active-duty army divisions to Europe within ten days as part of a wartime NATO general deployment. In addition to assessing the capabilities of the United States, Reforger also monitored the personnel, facilities, and equipment of the European countries playing a significant role in the reinforcement effort. The exercise was intended to ensure that NATO could quickly deploy forces to West Germany in the event of a conflict with the Warsaw Pact.
The Warsaw Pact outnumbered NATO throughout the Cold War in conventional forces, and especially in tanks and armoured vehicles. Therefore, in the event of a Soviet invasion, in order not to resort to tactical nuclear strikes, NATO forces defending against a Warsaw Pact armored spearhead would have to be quickly resupplied and replaced.

Reforger was not merely a show of force. In the event of a conflict, it would be the actual plan to strengthen the NATO presence in Europe. In that instance, it would have been referred to as Operation Reforger. The political goals of Reforger were to promote extended deterrence and foster NATO cohesion. Important components in Reforger included the Military Airlift Command, the Military Sealift Command, and the Civil Reserve Air Fleet.

Seven Days to the River Rhine

Seven Days to the River Rhine was a top-secret military simulation exercise developed in 1979 by the Warsaw Pact. It started with the assumption that NATO would launch a nuclear attack on the Vistula river valley in a first-strike scenario, which would result in as many as two million Polish civilian casualties. In response, a Soviet counter-strike would be carried out against West Germany, Belgium, the Netherlands and Denmark, with Warsaw Pact forces invading West Germany and aiming to stop at the River Rhine by the seventh day. Other USSR plans stopped only upon reaching the French border on day nine. Individual Warsaw Pact states were only assigned their subpart of the strategic picture; in this case, the Polish forces were only expected to go as far as Germany. The Seven Days to the Rhine plan envisioned that Poland and Germany would be largely destroyed by nuclear exchanges and that large numbers of troops would die of radiation sickness. It was estimated that NATO would fire nuclear weapons behind the advancing Soviet lines to cut off their supply lines and thus blunt their advance. While this plan assumed that NATO would use nuclear weapons to push back any Warsaw Pact invasion, it did not include nuclear strikes on France or the United Kingdom. Newspapers speculated when this plan was declassified, that France and the UK were not to be hit to get them to withhold the use of their nuclear weapons.

Exercise Able Archer

Exercise Able Archer was an annual exercise by the U.S. European Command that practiced command and control procedures, with emphasis on the transition from solely conventional operations to chemical, nuclear, and conventional operations during a time of war.

"Able Archer 83" was a five-day North Atlantic Treaty Organization (NATO) command post exercise starting on 7 November 1983, that spanned Western Europe, centered on the Supreme Headquarters Allied Powers Europe (SHAPE) Headquarters in Casteau, north of the city of Mons. Able Archer's exercises simulated a period of conflict escalation, culminating in a coordinated nuclear attack.

The realistic nature of the 1983 exercise, coupled with deteriorating relations between the United States and the Soviet Union and the anticipated arrival of strategic Pershing II nuclear missiles in Europe, led some members of the Soviet Politburo and military to believe that Able Archer 83 was a ruse of war, obscuring preparations for a genuine nuclear first strike. In response, the Soviets readied their nuclear forces and placed air units in East Germany and Poland on alert.
This "1983 war scare" is considered by many historians to be the closest the world has come to nuclear war since the Cuban Missile Crisis of 1962. The threat of nuclear war ended with the conclusion of the exercise on 11 November, however.

Strategic Defense Initiative

The Strategic Defense Initiative (SDI) was proposed by U.S. President Ronald Reagan on 23 March 1983. In the latter part of his presidency, numerous factors (which included watching the 1983 movie The Day After and hearing through a Soviet defector that Able Archer 83 almost triggered a Russian first strike) had turned Ronald Reagan against the concept of winnable nuclear war, and he began to see nuclear weapons as more of a "wild card" than a strategic deterrent. Although he later believed in disarmament treaties slowly blunting the danger of nuclear weaponry by reducing their number and alert status, he also believed a technological solution might allow incoming ICBMs to be shot down, thus making the US invulnerable to a first strike. However, the USSR saw the SDI concept as a major threat, since a unilateral deployment of the system would allow the US to launch a massive first strike on the Soviet Union without any fear of retaliation.

The SDI concept was to use ground-based and space-based systems to protect the United States from attack by strategic nuclear ballistic missiles. The initiative focused on strategic defense rather than the prior strategic offense doctrine of mutually assured destruction (MAD). The Strategic Defense Initiative Organization (SDIO) was set up in 1984 within the United States Department of Defense to oversee the Strategic Defense Initiative.

NATO nuclear sharing

NATO operational plans for a Third World War have involved NATO allies who do not have their nuclear weapons, using nuclear weapons supplied by the United States as part of a general NATO war plan, under the direction of NATO's Supreme Allied Commander.

Of the three nuclear powers in NATO (France, the United Kingdom, and the United States) only the United States has provided weapons for nuclear sharing. , Belgium, Germany, Italy, the Netherlands and Turkey are still hosting US nuclear weapons as part of NATO's nuclear sharing policy. Canada hosted weapons until 1984, and Greece until 2001. The United Kingdom also received US tactical nuclear weapons such as nuclear artillery and Lance missiles until 1992, despite the UK being a nuclear weapons state in its own right; these were mainly deployed in Germany.

In peacetime, the nuclear weapons stored in non-nuclear countries are guarded by US airmen though previously some artillery and missile systems were guarded by US Army soldiers; the codes required for detonating them are under American control. In case of war, the weapons are to be mounted on the participating countries' warplanes. The weapons are under custody and control of USAF Munitions Support Squadrons co-located on NATO main operating bases that work together with the host nation forces.

, 180 tactical B61 nuclear bombs of the 480 US nuclear weapons believed to be deployed in Europe fall under the nuclear sharing arrangement. The weapons are stored within a vault in hardened aircraft shelters, using the USAF WS3 Weapon Storage and Security System. The delivery warplanes used are F-16 Fighting Falcons and Panavia Tornados.

Historical close calls

With the initiation of the Cold War arms race in the 1950s, an apocalyptic war between the United States and the Soviet Union became a real possibility. During the Cold War era (1947–1991), several military events have been described as having come close to potentially triggering World WarIII.

Korean War: 25 June 1950 – 27 July 1953 

The Korean War was a war between two coalitions fighting for control over the Korean Peninsula: a communist coalition including North Korea, the People's Republic of China, and the Soviet Union, and a capitalist coalition including South Korea, the United States and the United Nations Command. Many then believed that the conflict was likely to soon escalate into a full-scale war between the three countries, the US, the USSR, and China. CBS News war correspondent Bill Downs wrote in 1951, "To my mind, the answer is: Yes, Korea is the beginning of World WarIII. The brilliant landings at Inchon and the cooperative efforts of the American armed forces with the United Nations Allies have won us a victory in Korea. But this is only the first battle in a major international struggle which now is engulfing the Far East and the entire world." Downs afterwards repeated this belief on ABC Evening News while reporting on the USS Pueblo incident in 1968. Secretary of State Dean Acheson later acknowledged that the Truman administration was concerned about the escalation of the conflict and that General Douglas MacArthur warned him that a U.S.-led intervention risked a Soviet response.

Berlin Crisis: 4 June – 9 November 1961 

The Berlin Crisis of 1961 was a political-military confrontation between the United States and the Soviet Union at Checkpoint Charlie with both several American and Soviet/East German tanks and troops at the stand-off at each other only 100 yards on either side of the checkpoint. The reason behind the confrontation was the occupational status of the German capital city, Berlin, and of post–World War II Germany. The Berlin Crisis started when the USSR launched an ultimatum demanding the withdrawal of all armed forces from Berlin, including the Western armed forces in West Berlin. The crisis culminated in the city's de facto partition with the East German erection of the Berlin Wall. This stand-off ended peacefully on 28 October following a US–Soviet understanding to withdraw tanks and reduce tensions.

Cuban Missile Crisis: 15–29 October 1962 

The Cuban Missile Crisis, a confrontation on the stationing of Soviet nuclear missiles in Cuba in response to the failed Bay of Pigs Invasion, is considered as having been the closest to a nuclear exchange, which could have precipitated a third World War. The crisis peaked on 27 October, with three separate major incidents occurring on the same day:

 The most critical incident occurred when a Soviet submarine nearly launched a nuclear-tipped torpedo in response to having been targeted by American naval depth charges in international waters, with the Soviet nuclear launch response only having been prevented by Soviet Navy executive officer Vasily Arkhipov.
 The shooting down of a Lockheed U-2 spy plane piloted by Rudolf Anderson while violating Cuban airspace.
 The near interception of another U-2 that had somehow managed to stray into Soviet airspace over Siberia, which airspace violation nearly caused the Soviets to believe that this might be the vanguard of a US aerial bombardment.

Despite what many believe to be the closest the world has come to a nuclear conflict, throughout the entire standoff, the Doomsday Clock, which is run by the Bulletin of the Atomic Scientists to estimate how close the end of the world, or doomsday, is, with midnight being the apocalypse, stayed at a relatively stable seven minutes to midnight. This has been explained as being due to the brevity of the crisis since the clock monitored more long-term factors such as the leadership of countries, conflicts, wars, and political upheavals, as well as societies' reactions to said factors.

The Bulletin of the Atomic Scientists now credits the political developments resulting from the Cuban Missile Crisis with having enhanced global stability. The Bulletin posits that future crises and occasions that might otherwise escalate, were rendered more stable due to two major factors: 
 A Washington to Moscow direct telephone line, resulted from the communication trouble between the White House and the Kremlin during the crisis, giving the leaders of the two largest nuclear powers the ability to contact each other in real-time, rather than sending written messages that needed to be translated and wired, which had dragged out conversations in which seconds could have potentially prevented a nuclear exchange.
 The second factor was caused in part due to the worldwide reaction to how close the US and USSR had come to the brink of World WarIII during the standoff. As the public began to more closely monitor topics involving nuclear weapons, and therefore to rally support for the cause of non-proliferation, the 1963 test ban treaty was signed. To date this treaty has been signed by 126 total nations, with the most notable exceptions being France and China. Both of these countries were still in the relative beginning stages of their nuclear programs at the time of the original treaty signing, and both sought nuclear capabilities independent of their allies.This Test Ban Treaty prevented the testing of nuclear ordnance that detonated in the atmosphere, limiting nuclear weapons testing to below ground and underwater, decreasing fallout and effects on the environment, and subsequently caused the Doomsday Clock to decrease by five minutes, to arrive at a total of twelve minutes to midnight. Up until this point, over 1000 nuclear bombs had been detonated, and concerns over both long and short term effects to the planet became increasingly more worrisome to scientists.

Sino-Soviet border conflicts: 2 March – 11 September 1969 

The Sino-Soviet border conflict was a seven-month undeclared military border war between the Soviet Union and China at the height of the Sino-Soviet split in 1969. The most serious of these border clashes, which brought the world's two largest communist states to the brink of war, occurred in March 1969 in the vicinity of Zhenbao (Damansky) Island on the Ussuri (Wusuli) River, near Manchuria.

The conflict resulted in a ceasefire, with a return to the status quo. Critics point out that the Chinese attack on Zhenbao was to deter any potential future Soviet invasions; that by killing some Soviets, China demonstrated that it could not be 'bullied'; and that Mao wanted to teach them 'a bitter lesson'.

China's relations with the USSR remained sour after the conflict, despite the border talks, which began in 1969 and continued inconclusively for a decade. Domestically, the threat of war caused by the border clashes inaugurated a new stage in the Cultural Revolution; that of China's thorough militarization. The 9th National Congress of the Chinese Communist Party, held in the aftermath of the Zhenbao Island incident, confirmed Defense Minister Lin Biao as Mao Zedong's heir apparent.

Following the events of 1969, the Soviet Union further increased its forces along the Sino-Soviet border, and in the Mongolian People's Republic.

Yom Kippur War superpower tensions: 6–25 October 1973 

The Yom Kippur War, also known as the Ramadan War, or October War, began with Arab victories. Israel successfully counterattacked. Tensions grew between the US (which supported Israel) and the Soviet Union (which sided with the Arab states). American and Soviet naval forces came close to firing upon each other in Mediterranean Sea. Admiral Daniel J. Murphy of the US Sixth Fleet reckoned the chances of the Soviet squadron attempting a first strike against his fleet at 40 percent. The Pentagon moved Defcon status from 4to3. The superpowers had been pushed to the brink of war, but tensions eased with the ceasefire brought in under UNSC 339.

NORAD computer error of 1979: 9 November 1979 
The United States made emergency retaliation preparations after NORAD saw on-screen indications that a full-scale Soviet attack had been launched. No attempt was made to use the "red telephone" hotline to clarify the situation with the USSR and it was not until early-warning radar systems confirmed no such launch had taken place that NORAD realized that a computer system test had caused the display errors. A senator inside the NORAD facility at the time described an atmosphere of absolute panic. A GAO investigation led to the construction of an off-site test facility to prevent similar mistakes.

Soviet radar malfunction: 26 September 1983 

A false alarm occurred on the Soviet nuclear early warning system, showing the launch of American LGM-30 Minuteman intercontinental ballistic missiles from bases in the United States. A retaliatory attack was prevented by Stanislav Petrov, a Soviet Air Defence Forces officer, who realised the system had simply malfunctioned (which was borne out by later investigations).

Able Archer escalations: 2–11 November 1983 

During Able Archer 83, a ten-day NATO exercise simulating a period of conflict escalation that culminated in a DEFCON 1 nuclear strike, some members of the Soviet Politburo and armed forces treated the events as a ruse of war concealing a genuine first strike. In response, the military prepared for a coordinated counter-attack by readying nuclear forces and placing air units stationed in the Warsaw Pact states of East Germany and Poland under high alert. However, the state of Soviet preparation for retaliation ceased upon completion of the Able Archer exercises.

Norwegian rocket incident: 25 January 1995 

The Norwegian rocket incident was the first World WarIII close call to occur outside the Cold War. This incident occurred when Russia's Olenegorsk early warning station accidentally mistook the radar signature from a Black Brant XII research rocket (being jointly launched by Norwegian and US scientists from Andøya Rocket Range), as appearing to be the radar signature of the launch of a Trident SLBM missile. In response, Russian President Boris Yeltsin was summoned and the Cheget nuclear briefcase was activated for the first and only time. However, the high command was soon able to determine that the rocket was not entering Russian airspace, and promptly aborted plans for combat readiness and retaliation. It was retrospectively determined that, while the rocket scientists had informed thirty states including Russia about the test launch, the information had not reached Russian radar technicians.

Incident at Pristina airport: 12 June 1999

On 12 June 1999, the day following the end of the Kosovo War, some 250 Russian peacekeepers occupied the Pristina International Airport ahead of the arrival of NATO troops and were to secure the arrival of reinforcements by air. American NATO Supreme Allied Commander Europe General Wesley Clark ordered the use of force against the Russians. Mike Jackson, a British Army general who contacted the Russians during the incident, refused to enforce Clark's orders, famously telling him "I'm not going to start the Third World War for you". Captain James Blunt, the lead officer at the front of the NATO column in the direct armed stand-off against the Russians, received the "Destroy!" orders from Clark over the radio, but he followed Jackson's orders to encircle the airfield instead and later said in an interview that even without Jackson's intervention he would have refused to follow Clark's order.

Current conflicts

Russian invasion of Ukraine: 24 February 2022–present

On 24 February 2022, Russia's president Vladimir Putin ordered a full-scale invasion of Ukraine, marking a major escalation of the Russo-Ukrainian War, which began in 2014. The invasion has been described as the largest military conflict in Europe since World War II. The invasion received widespread international condemnation, including new sanctions imposed on Russia, which notably included Russia's ban from SWIFT and the closing of most Western airspace to Russian planes. Moreover, both prior to and during the invasion, some of the 30 member states of NATO have been providing Ukraine with arms and other materiel support. Throughout the invasion, several senior Russian politicians, including president Putin, foreign minister Sergei Lavrov and party leader Dmitry Medvedev, have made a number of statements widely seen as threatening the use of nuclear weapons, while several officials from the United States and NATO, including US president Joe Biden and NATO secretary general Jens Stoltenberg, have made statements reaffirming NATO's response in the event that Russia attacks any NATO member state or uses nuclear weapons, while also reiterating the need to prevent the crisis from escalating into a potential third World War.

On 15 November, a missile struck the Polish village of Przewodów near the border with Ukraine, killing two people. It was the first incident of a missile landing and exploding within NATO territory during the invasion. Despite initial statements regarding a close call to a conflict between Russia and NATO, the United States found that the missile was likely to have been an air defense missile fired by Ukrainian forces at an incoming Russian missile.

On 21 February 2023, Putin suspended Russia's participation in the last remaining nuclear treaty, New START, which had forbidden Russia from testing nuclear weapons.

Various experts, analysts, and others have described the crisis as a close call to a third World War, while others have suggested the contrary.

Extended usage of the term

Cold War

As Soviet-American relations grew tense in the post-World WarII period, the fear that the tension could escalate into World WarIII was ever-present. A Gallup poll in December 1950 found that more than half of Americans considered World WarIII to have already started.

In 2004, commentator Norman Podhoretz proposed that the Cold War, lasting from the surrender of the Axis Powers until the fall of the Berlin Wall, might rightly be called World WarIII. By Podhoretz's reckoning, "World WarIV" would be the global campaign against Islamofascism.

Still, the majority of historians would seem to hold that World WarIII would necessarily have to be a worldwide "war in which large forces from many countries fought" and a war that "involves most of the principal nations of the world". The Cold War received its name from the lack of action taken from both sides. The lack of action was out of fear that a nuclear war would possibly destroy humanity. In his book Secret Weapons of the Cold War, Bill Yenne explains that the military standoff that occurred between the two 'Superpowers', namely the United States and the Soviet Union, from the 1940s through to 1991, was only the Cold War, which ultimately helped to enable mankind to avert the possibility of an all-out nuclear confrontation, and that it certainly was not World WarIII.

War on terror

The "war on terror" that began with the September 11 attacks has been claimed by some to be World WarIII or sometimes as World WarIV. Others have disparaged such claims as "distorting American history". While there is general agreement amongst historians regarding the definitions and extent of the first two world wars, namely due to the unmistakable global scale of aggression and self-destruction of these two wars, a few have claimed that a "World War" might now no longer require such worldwide and large scale aggression and carnage. Still, such claims of a new "lower threshold of aggression", that might now be sufficient to qualify a war as a "World War" have not gained such widespread acceptance and support as the definitions of the first two world wars have received amongst historians.

War on the Islamic State

On 1 February 2015, Iraqi Foreign Minister Ibrahim al-Jaafari declared that the war against the Islamic State was effectively "World WarIII", due to the Islamic State's aims for a worldwide caliphate, and its success in spreading the conflict to multiple countries outside of the Levant region. In response to the November 2015 Paris attacks, King of Jordan Abdullah II stated "We are facing a Third World War [within Islam]".

In his State of the Union Address on 12 January 2016, U.S. President Barack Obama warned that news reports granting ISIL the supposed ability to foment a third World War might be excessive and irresponsible, stating that "as we focus on destroying ISIL, over-the-top claims that this is World WarIII just play into their hands. Masses of fighters on the back of pickup trucks and twisted souls plotting in apartments or garages pose an enormous danger to civilians and must be stopped. But they do not threaten our national existence."

Multiple small wars as a "third war"
In multiple recorded interviews under somewhat casual circumstances, comparing the conflagrations of World WarI andII to the ongoing lower-intensity wars of the 21st century, Pope Francis has said, "The world is at war because it has lost the peace", and "perhaps one can speak of a third war, one fought piecemeal".

Hypothetical scenarios
In 1949, after the unleashing of nuclear weaponry at the end of World War II, physicist Albert Einstein suggested that any outcome of a possible World War III would be so dire as to revert mankind to the Stone Age. When asked by journalist Alfred Werner what types of weapons Einstein believed World WarIII might be fought with, Einstein warned, "I know not with what weapons World WarIII will be fought, but World WarIV will be fought with sticks and stones".

A 1998 New England Journal of Medicine overview found that "Although many people believe that the threat of a nuclear attack largely disappeared with the end of the Cold War, there is considerable evidence to the contrary". In particular, the United States – Russia mutual detargeting agreement in 1994 was largely symbolic, and did not change the amount of time required to launch an attack. The most likely "accidental-attack" scenario was believed to be a retaliatory launch due to a false warning. Historically, World War I happened through an escalating crisis; World War II happened through deliberate action. Hypothesized flashpoints in the 2010s and the 2020s include the Russo-Ukrainian War, Chinese expansion into adjacent islands and seas, and foreign involvement in the Syrian civil war. Other hypothesized risks are that a war involving or between Saudi Arabia and Iran, Israel and Iran, India and Pakistan, Ukraine and Russia, South Korea/United States and North Korea, or Taiwan and China could escalate via alliances or intervention into a war between "great powers" such as the United States, United Kingdom, France, Germany, Russia, China, India, and Japan; or that a "rogue commander" under any nuclear power might launch an unauthorized strike that escalates into full war.

According to a peer-reviewed study published in the journal Nature Food in August 2022, a full-scale nuclear war between the United States and Russia, releasing over 150 Tg of stratospheric soot, could kill more than 5 billion indirectly by starvation during a nuclear winter. More than 2 billion people could die of starvation from a smaller-scale (5–47 Tg) nuclear war between India and Pakistan.

Some scenarios involve risks due to upcoming changes from the known status quo. In the 1980s the Strategic Defense Initiative made an effort at nullifying the USSR's nuclear arsenal; some analysts believe the initiative was "destabilizing". In his book Destined for War, Graham Allison views the global rivalry between the established power, the US, and the rising power, China, as an example of the Thucydides Trap. Allison states that historically, "12 of 16 past cases where a rising power has confronted a ruling power" have led to fighting. In the first book devoted to the subject of military globalization, historian Max Ostrovsky argues that World War III is precluded due to unipolar distribution of power and unipolar alliance configuration, unless the Second American Civil War erupts and goes global. If we ever have World War III, he says, it would be USNORTHCOM fighting USPACOM and USEUCOM. In January 2020, the Bulletin of the Atomic Scientists advanced its Doomsday Clock, citing among other factors a predicted destabilizing effect from upcoming hypersonic weapons.

Emerging technologies, such as artificial intelligence, could hypothetically generate risk in the decades ahead. A 2018 RAND Corporation report has argued that AI and associated information technology "will have a large effect on nuclear-security issues in the next quarter century". A hypothetical future AI could provide a destabilizing ability to track "second-launch" launchers. Incorporating AI into decision support systems used to decide whether to launch, could also generate new risks, including the risk of an adversarial exploitation of such an AI's algorithms by a third party to trigger a launch recommendation. A perception that some sort of emerging technology would lead to "world domination" might also be destabilizing, for example by leading to fear of a pre-emptive strike.

Cyber warfare is the exploitation of technology by a nation-state or international organization to attack and destroy the opposing nation's information networks and computers. The damage can be caused by computer viruses or denial-of-service attacks (DoS). Cyberattacks are becoming increasingly common, threatening cybersecurity and making it a global priority. There has been a proliferation of state-sponsored attacks. The trends of these attacks suggest the potential of a cyber World War III. The world's leading militaries are developing cyber strategies, including ways to alter the enemy's command and control systems, early warning systems, logistics, and transportation. The 2022 Russian invasion of Ukraine has sparked concerns about a large-scale cyber attack, with Russia having previously launched cyberattacks to compromise organizations across Ukraine. Nearly 40 discrete attacks were launched by Russia which permanently destroyed files in hundreds of systems across dozens of organizations, with 40% aimed at critical infrastructure sectors in Ukraine. Russia's use of cyberwarfare has turned the war into a large-scale "hybrid" war in Ukraine.

See also

 Anti-nuclear movement
 Artificial intelligence arms race
 Artificial Intelligence Cold War
 List of projected death tolls from nuclear attacks on cities
 Nuclear arms race
 Nuclear holocaust
 Nuclear terrorism
 Second Cold War
 World War III in popular culture

References

Further reading

 Huntington, Samuel (1996). The Clash of Civilizations and the Remaking of World Order Simon & Schuster, New York. .
 
 Mearsheimer, John (2001). The Tragedy of Great Power Politics. W. W. Norton, New York. .
 
 Piepers, Ingo (2016). 2020: WARning. Conijn Advies. .

War
World Wars
Fictional wars
Political terminology
Global conflicts
 
Possible future wars
Doomsday scenarios
Nuclear warfare
1940s neologisms
Articles containing video clips
Theories of history
War scare